Mahmoud Ahmadzadeh (1933 – 1 September 2022) was an Iranian engineer and politician.

References

1933 births
2022 deaths
People from Mashhad
Freedom Movement of Iran politicians
Government ministers of Iran
20th-century Iranian engineers